The Noble M15 is a sports car designed and developed by Noble Automotive, a high-performance sports car manufacturer based in Leicestershire, England.

Production of the M15 was due to begin in early 2006. The Noble M15 is intended to appeal to a far broader market than the M12-GTO3R or the M400 and compete directly with the Porsche 911 Turbo/GT-3 and Ferrari F430. As a result, the Noble M15 has a number of features not previously found on Nobles such as satellite navigation, traction control, electric windows and ABS.

Noble founder Lee Noble has been quoted in indicating "the M12 is a great car, but it's very focused and [he] wanted to produce a supercar people could use every day... It was time for Noble to take a big step up in terms of refinement, practicality and style."  Despite increased comfort and usability compared to previous Noble cars, Lee Noble has also stated that the M15 is significantly quicker than the M400 around a race track.

Design
The car is based on a brand new platform with a longitudinally-mounted engine connected to a bespoke gearbox created by Graziano. The double wishbone suspension is a development of the system mounted on the M400. Mounting the engine longitudinally (rather than transversely as on the M400) allowed the engine designers to increase the cooling flow to the engine, which allows the  twin-turbo Ford Duratec V6 engine to develop . The engine has been designed to meet European emission standards and the new steel/aluminium space frame has been designed with a view to passing crash test regulations around the world. The M15 is planned to be the first Noble which gains European and US type approval.

Like all the Noble M models, the M15 has a steel spaceframe and roll cage covered with graphite-reinforced plastic body panelling, ventilated disc brakes front and rear, but unlike the previous models is designed to be more of a grand tourer/everyday sports car (an example of which would be the now-defunct Honda NSX) rather than an all-out track day car.

Its body shape is a coupé and it has 2 seats. In Britain it costs £74,950.

When it appeared on the popular British car TV show Top Gear, it was driven by Richard Hammond who praised its handling ("it just grips and grips, and then there's a tiny little bit of understeer to tell you you're being a bit of a spanner.") When it was handed over to Top Gear's 'tame racing driver', The Stig, it completed a lap of their circuit in 1:22.5, a time faster than a Ferrari F430 (1:22.9), and an Audi R8 (1:24.4). It was praised by Jeremy Clarkson, who called it "one of those Giant Killers."

The M15 was replaced by the Noble M600 in mid-2011, when all production on the M15 stopped.

Drivetrain
This Noble M15 has a longitudinally-mounted rear mid-engine, rear-wheel-drive layout; chassis made of composite body steel space frame; double wishbone suspension, coil springs, gas pressurised dampers; steering rack-and-pinion, power assisted, speed sensitive; ventilated disc brakes all-round; weight ; Length / Width / Height 4,270 mm (168.1 in) / 1,850 mm (72.8 in) / 1,116 mm (43.9 in); Wheelbase / Track (fr/r) 2,438 mm (96 in) / 1,594 mm (62.8 in) / 1,503 mm (59.2 in).

Engine

Transmission
The car has a 6-speed manual transmission as standard.

References

External links
Official M15 homepage

M15
Sports cars
Cars introduced in 2006
Rear mid-engine, rear-wheel-drive vehicles